Daniel Barden is the name of:

Daniel Barden (footballer) (born 2001), Welsh footballer
Daniel Barden (shooting victim), victim of Sandy Hook massacre